is a Japanese politician of the Democratic Party of Japan, a member of the House of Councillors in the Diet (national legislature). A native of Ōita, Ōita, he was elected for the first time in 1995 as a member of the New Frontier Party. In November 2011, he was elected as the President of the House of Councillors.

References

External links 
 Official website in Japanese.

1944 births
Living people
Members of the House of Councillors (Japan)
People from Ōita (city)
Democratic Party of Japan politicians
Presidents of the House of Councillors (Japan)